Yoder Mill, also known as Renninger Mill, is a historic grist mill located in Pike Township, Berks County, Pennsylvania.  The mill was built in 1796, and is a -story, frame building measuring 41 feet by 50 feet.  It sits on a stone basement.  It was rebuilt in 1885 after a fire. Also on the property is a contributing -story, stuccoed stone miller's house (c. 1885) the headrace and millpond. The merchant mill ceased operation in the 1940s.

It was listed on the National Register of Historic Places in 1990.

Gallery

References

Industrial buildings completed in 1796
Houses completed in 1885
Grinding mills in Berks County, Pennsylvania
Grinding mills on the National Register of Historic Places in Pennsylvania
Houses in Berks County, Pennsylvania
National Register of Historic Places in Berks County, Pennsylvania
1796 establishments in Pennsylvania